This is a list of singles that have peaked at number-one in France from the Top 100 Singles chart compiled weekly by Institut français d'opinion publique (1955 - 1983) and Syndicat National de l'Édition Phonographique (since 1984).

1950s

IFOP

1960s

1970s

1980s

SNEP

1990s

2000s

2010s

2020s

See also
French popular music
List of artists who reached number one on the French Singles Chart